Who Do You Think You Are? is a book of short stories by Alice Munro, recipient of the 2013 Nobel Prize in Literature, published by Macmillan of Canada in 1978. It won the 1978 Governor General's Award for English Fiction, her second win of that prize.

Outside of Canada, the book was published as The Beggar Maid. Under that title, it was also nominated for the Booker Prize in 1980.

The collection of short stories revolves around protagonist Rose. The collection has been labelled by some critics as a novel, as the same characters and similar themes recur throughout the book, but there is no formal cohesiveness in plot. Each story explores an idea, and is not bound by a particular time, place, setting, or narrative voice.

Stories
 "Royal Beatings"
 "Privilege"
 "Half a Grapefruit"
 "Wild Swans"
 "The Beggar Maid"
 "Mischief"
 "Providence"
 "Simon's Luck"
 "Spelling"
 "Who Do You Think You Are?"

Summary
As suggested by the title, the theme of identity is central to the collection. The short stories can be described as a bildungsroman. Rose grows up in a small town, abused by her father, and living in an impoverished home. In "Half a Grapefruit", she begins attending a school on the more affluent part of town. In class, when asked what she ate for breakfast, she lies and says "half a grapefruit" rather than revealing her mundane, considerably less glamorous meal. The lie haunts her, and she is embarrassed by her upbringing.

Rose ends up winning a scholarship to attend university. On a train ride to Toronto, she is  molested by a clergyman; she chooses to ignore this incident, but it has irreparable damage on her future relationships with men. At university she meets her husband who has a medieval perspective of women—he is drawn to her because he sees her as a damsel in distress. Her marriage eventually ends, and she has to juggle being a mother, meeting other men, and her acting career.

One of her significant relationships is with Simon, a charming man she meets at a friend's house. The two spend the weekend together, and she grows attached to him (she describes it as developing an understanding for Simon's many personas). He disappears unexpectedly afterwards. She later discovers that Simon has died.

The final few short stories have her returning home; this gives her a chance to close the chapter of her life involving her complicated relationship with her stepmother Flo.

External links
 Who Do You Think You Are? at the Literary Encyclopedia

1978 short story collections
Short story collections by Alice Munro
Governor General's Award-winning fiction books
Macmillan Publishers books